Helen Karagounis (née Thieme, born 1981) is a British athlete who finished fourth in the Women's 4 × 400 metres Relay at the 2004 Summer Olympics. Karagounis could inherit a bronze medal from this event as an American athlete Crystal Cox was later found guilty of doping offences.

References

British female sprinters
1981 births
English female sprinters
Living people
Sportspeople from Nottingham
People educated at Nottingham Girls' High School
Athletes (track and field) at the 2004 Summer Olympics
Olympic athletes of Great Britain
Commonwealth Games medallists in athletics
Commonwealth Games silver medallists for England
Athletes (track and field) at the 2002 Commonwealth Games
Olympic female sprinters
Medallists at the 2002 Commonwealth Games